The Re-Mission games for young cancer patients were conceived by Pam Omidyar and designed based research by the nonprofit HopeLab Foundation, with direct input from young cancer patients and oncology doctors and nurses, and game developer Realtime Associates, among others. The games engage young cancer patients through entertaining game play while impacting specific psychological and behavioral outcomes associated with successful cancer treatment. HopeLab has made Re-Mission games available at no charge to young people with cancer and their families, as well as oncology healthcare workers and institutions around the world.

Re-Mission
The original Re-Mission game was released in 2006 as a Microsoft Windows based third-person shooter based in the serious games genre. In Re-Mission, the player controls an RX5-E ("Roxxi") nanobot who is designed to be injected into the human body and fight particular types of cancer and related infections such as non-Hodgkin lymphoma and leukemia, at a cellular level. The player must also monitor patient health and report any symptoms back to Dr. West (the in-game doctor and project leader). Each of the 20 levels is designed to inform the patient on a variety of treatments, how they function, and the importance of maintaining strict adherence to those treatments. Various "weapons" are used, such as the Chemoblaster, Radiation Gun, and antibiotic rocket.

Copies of Re-Mission were distributed at no charge to others, though donations were accepted. As of 2012, more than 200,000 copies of Re-Mission had been distributed in 81 countries, placing it among the most successful serious games to date. HopeLab engaged organizations and individuals worldwide to facilitate distribution of the game to teens and young adults with cancer. On May 30, 2007, Cigna HealthCare announced a partnership with HopeLab in which Cigna distributes copies of Re-Mission to its members at no cost. HopeLab has also partnered with Starlight Children's Foundation and the ESA Foundation to distribute Re-Mission.

Re-Mission 2
Re-Mission 2 is the 2013 follow-up to the original game. A collection of free online games, Re-Mission 2 is designed to improve psychological and behavioral outcomes associated with cancer treatment adherence.  Each game puts players inside the body to fight cancer with weapons like chemotherapy, antibiotics and the body's natural defenses. Game play parallels real-world strategies used to fight cancer and win. More than 120 young people with cancer participated in the research and development of the games.

Re-Mission 2 applies insights from a brain-imaging study published in 2012 by HopeLab and Stanford University researchers, showing that the Re-Mission video game strongly activates brain circuits involved in positive motivation.  This reward-related activation is associated with a shift in attitudes and emotions that helped boost players’ adherence to prescribed chemotherapy and antibiotic treatments in a previous study.  As a result, each Re-Mission 2 game is designed to boost positive emotion, increase self-efficacy, and shift attitudes toward chemotherapy.

Each Re-Mission 2 game puts players inside the body to defeat cancer, using weapons like chemotherapy, antibiotics and the body's immune cells. The games are designed specifically for teens and young adults who are at risk of adverse cancer outcomes due to poor treatment adherence.  Research on Re-Mission 2 shows that the new games are as effective as the original Re-Mission game in increasing players’ self-efficacy, boosting positive emotions and shifting attitudes about chemotherapy.
Re-Mission 2 games are free to play online at re-mission2.org, and Re-Mission 2: Nanobot’s Revenge is available for download as a mobile app for iOS and Android devices. The browser-based games and mobile app offer a variety of game play styles for young cancer patients who spend time online and on mobile devices.

Research
HopeLab conducted an international, multicenter randomized controlled trial to gauge the efficacy of Re-Mission as it relates to compliance with prescribed chemotherapy and antibiotic treatments, cancer-related knowledge, and self-efficacy. The study enrolled 375 cancer patients aged 13–29 at 34 medical centers in the United States, Canada and Australia. Subjects received either computers pre-loaded with a popular commercial video game (the control group) or computers preloaded with the same control game plus Re-Mission. Study results indicated that playing Re-Mission led to more consistent treatment adherence, faster rate of increase in cancer knowledge, and faster rate of increase in self-efficacy in young cancer patients. These findings were published in August 2008 in the peer-reviewed medical journal Pediatrics. Notably, to ascertain treatment compliance, researches used objective blood tests to measure levels of prescribed chemotherapy in the bodies of study participants rather than subjective self-report questionnaires, and electronic pill-cap monitors were used to determine utilization of prescribed antibiotics. Researchers concluded that a carefully designed video game can have a positive impact on health behavior in young people with chronic illness and that video-game–based interventions may constitute a component of a broader integrative approach to healthcare that synergistically combines rationally targeted biological and behavioral interventions to aid patients in the prevention, detection, treatment, and recovery from disease. HopeLab conducted additional research to understand the mechanisms of action that make Re-Mission effective.  Results of an fMRI study of Re-Mission showing the impact of the game on neurological processes were presented in August 2008 at the 10th International Congress of the Society of Behavioral Medicine. This research informed HopeLab's development of Re-Mission 2.

References

External links
 HopeLab main site
 Re-Mission main site supporting game orders and online community
 Re-Mission 2 main site supporting online game play
 Ruckus Nation idea competition main site

Articles and videos
 Using a Mobile App to Fight Cancer, HUFFPOST Live, November 5, 2013
 "Games for Health Keynote Speaker Steve W. Cole on ReMission" by Erin Hoffman, Serious Games Source (November, 2006)
 "Video Games Aim to Hook Children on Better Health" by Christopher Lee, The Washington Post (October 21, 2006)
 "Cigna and HopeLab Team up to Bring Health Games to Medical Professionals, Patients," Digital Journal (September 16, 2013)
 "Re-Mission: game sequel lets you blast cancer cells," USA Today (September 19, 2013)
 "HopeLab: Providing Help Through Video Games," Gaming Illustrated (September 30, 2013)
 "Learning to Game Your Way to Better Health," The Huffington Post Blog (May 20, 2013)
 "HopeLab's Playful Approach to Overcoming Childhood Obesity" Smart Planet (October 30, 2009)
 "Silicon Valley Nonprofit in Spotlight After Trip to White House" San Jose Mercury News (July 15, 2009)
 "A Video Game Helping Kids With Cancer" CTV Toronto (August 7, 2008)
 "Video Game Helps Young Cancer Patients Take Meds" Reuters (August 5, 2008)
 "Startup Uses Video Games to Heal Young People" San Francisco Chronicle (August 4, 2008)
 "Video Game Helps Kids Blast at Their Cancer" Toronto Star (August 4, 2008)
 "Study Shows Video Games Can Change Behavior, Biology" Press Release (August 4, 2008)
 "A Video Game Improves Behavioral Outcomes in Adolescents and Young Adults With Cancer: A Randomized Trial" Pediatrics (August 2008)
 "OMG! Denver Girls Txt It! Game Is Winner" Denver Post (March 30, 2008)
 "Winners Announced in HopeLab’s Global Competition to Get Kids Moving!" Press Release (March 17, 2008)
 "F as in Fat: How Obesity Policies are Failing in America" Trust for America's Health (August 2007)
 "2005-2006 President's Cancer Panel report"

2006 video games
Educational video games
Oncology
Third-person shooters
Video games developed in the United States
Windows games
Windows-only games